Sergei Vladimirovich Larin (born 22 July 1986, in Almaty) is a Kazakhstani football manager and former player, He is currently massagist coach of FC Astana.

Career
Larin began his career by Tsesna Almaty who played in his first professional season nineteen games and scored four goals. After this big debut he played 128 games for FC Almaty in five years before signed for a new founded club FC Lokomotiv Astana, where he played only one game in six months and signed in summer 2009 for FC Atyrau.

International career
He was three years member of the Kazakhstan national football team and played in 26 games before in summer 2008 retired from his international career.

References

External links

Living people
1986 births
Kazakhstani footballers
Sportspeople from Almaty
Association football midfielders
Kazakhstan international footballers
FC Astana players
FC Atyrau players
FC Astana managers
Kazakhstani football managers